St. Jude India ChildCare Centres (also known as St. Judes) is a not-for-profit organization in India. St Jude India provides free-of-charge shelter and holistic care to children who are undergoing cancer treatment along with their families. It is a Section 8 non-profit company supported by individuals, corporate houses, and Charity Trusts. 

Founded in 2006 by Nihal and Shyama Kaviratne, St. Judes has 39 centers located in Mumbai, Kolkata, Guwahati, Delhi, Jaipur, Vellore, Chennai, Varanasi, and Hyderabad. The free of cost accommodation and holistic care includes an infection-free environment conducive to the child's recovery, educational and recreational services for the children and their parents, and counseling services throughout the duration of their treatment. 

St. Judes credo has always been ‘Once a St. Judes child is always a St. Judes child’. In keeping with this vision, their new vertical St. Judes for Life has been established in the memory of Mrs. Rani Vicaji, to ensure that these children who have won the battle against cancer are able to fulfil their potential. They come from underprivileged families who had made great sacrifices to ensure that the child was treated successfully for cancer. To this end, St. Judes for Life continues to provide support to the survivors (also called Judians) as the need arises.

About St. Judes
Parents bring their cancer-affected children from distant villages and towns in India all the way to large cities where they can get medical treatment at minimum or zero cost. During the treatment, there are intermittent periods of rest when the child recuperating from chemotherapy treatment must be protected against opportunistic secondary infections resulting from unhygienic conditions and poor-quality food. The unavailability of hygienic shelter, nutritious food, having to travel to and from the hospital, and emotional distress often forces the parents to abandon their child's treatment. By providing the child and the parents with an infection-free accommodation and the necessary nutritional and holistic support - all free of cost, St. Judes makes a crucial intervention leading to the child's recovery and a noticeable increase in the survival rates of child patients with cancer.

In addition, St. Judes also addresses the families' educational, recreational, and emotional needs under its care by organizing customized educational programs, celebrations of cultural events, and outings. Transport facilities too are extended to patients for hospital visits. Regular counseling and alternative therapy sessions are held to help the families cope with the stress and trauma that they undergo during the treatment.

Founded by Mr. and Mrs. Kaviratne, the first center for St. Judes was established in Parel, Mumbai. This prototype center had eight individual family units, each accommodating a child patient and its parents. This prototype has now been replicated across the county. In Parel, centers are located close to Tata Memorial Hospital, where most children receive medical treatment. A campus at Cotton Green has also been established in partnership with Mumbai Port Trust (MPT) and Tata Memorial Hospital (TMH), accommodating 165 families close to Tata Memorial Hospital. Centers have also been established in Kharghar, on the campus of the Advanced Centre for Treatment, Research and Education in Cancer (ACTREC); the R&D section of the Tata Memorial Hospital, with a particular center only for patients recuperating from Bone Marrow Transplants.

The total number of family units across India is 492, set up in 39 centers.

Donations to St. Judes are eligible for tax exemption under Section 80G of the Income Tax Act, 1961.

About the Founders 
Mr. Nihal Kaviratne CBE: As a result of his 40 years experience working at Unilever, Nihal pursues a keen interest in good corporate governance and corporate social responsibility, developing models for replication by others. He was a founding member of the Board of Governors of President University in Indonesia and one of "25 leaders at the forefront of change" chosen by Business Week in 2002 for the Stars of Asia Award. He was awarded for driving Business Excellence at World Business Conclave 2016 in Hong Kong. Nihal was cited in the Queen's 2004 New Year Honours List in the UK and was awarded the CBE (Commander of the Most Excellent Order of the British Empire) for services to UK business interests and to sustainable development in Indonesia.

In January 2004, he moved from being Chairman of Unilever Indonesia to a regional role in the Unilever Asia Business Group based in Singapore as Senior Vice President - Development & Environmental Affairs. In January 2005, he assumed additional responsibility as Chairman of Unilever's US$2.5 billion Home & Oral Care business in Asia. Today, Nihal is a Director of DBS Group & Bank, DBS Foundation Limited, StarHub, OLAM, GSK Pharma India, and Chairman of Caraway Pte Ltd. He was appointed to the Advisory Board of Bain & Company for SEA/Indonesia from August 2013, and was appointed a member of the Global Corporate Resilience Advisory Council of McKinsey effective January 2018. He is a member of the Governing Board of Bombay Mothers & Children Welfare Society and a Member of the Private Sector Portfolio Advisory Committee in India of the UK Government's Department for International Development (DFID).

Ms. Shyama Kaviratne: She has been associated from childhood with the fields of social work and charity. Having completed her studies in management, her 20-year experience working with a nationalized bank provides her with the ability to deal with a vast section of society and about project finance.

International Support
SJICC UK is a registered charity in the UK (No. 1120539) with the objective to relieve sickness, preserve and protect good health and relieve poverty, relating but not limited to children under the age of 15 suffering from chronic disease in India.

SJICC USA aims to provide a tax-effective way for residents and taxpayers of the US to make donations that enable the organization to fund grant applications submitted by charities in India that meet its objectives.

Awards and Honours 

The Organisation was recently rated 'VO 1A' grading by CRISIL This is the fourth time St. Judes has received this honour.  

St. Judes was once again recognised amongst 'India’s Top 10 Best NGOs to Work For - 2022'. The recognition comes from Great Place to Work, the global authority in creating, assessing and identifying the best workplaces the world over. The organisation has now received this coveted recognition four times in a row. This year, St. Judes was also recognised amongst the 'Top 50 Mid-Size India’s Best Workplaces for Women 2022' by the Great Place to Work Institute.

St. Judes has received GuideStar India Platinum certification for legal & financial compliances and sharing these transparently in the public domain. Also, Platinum Winner 2018 by the GuideStar India NGO Transparency Awards. The organization is also accredited by Credibility Alliance under Desirable Norms.

St. Judes has entered into a Partnership with UTI Mutual Fund, introducing a facility called "CanServe" for investments under UTI Balanced Fund, UTI Spread Fund, and UTI Master share Unit Scheme. "CanServe" will enable investors to contribute their dividend payouts if they are under the dividend payout option or specified amounts as desired, if they are under the growth option, towards St. Judes as a donation for needy and underprivileged children who are being treated for cancer and their families, during the period of the child's treatment.

St. Judes has been honored with the following awards:

 Great Place To Work Certified
 CRISIL Voluntary Organization VO 1A
 GiveIndia Give Assured 5 Stars
 Credibility Alliance Certificate Of Accreditation
 GuideStar India Champion Level - Platinum certification 2019
 Dr. B. Borooah Cancer Institute, Guwahati Award Of Appreciation
 World CSR Congress 2017: Certificate of Merit
 AmeriCares 5th Spirit of Humanity Awards, 2014
 Vocational Service Award for Outstanding Service to Humanity, 2014
 Can India Conclave Certificate for Excellence, 2013
 Qimpro Gold Standard Healthcare Award, 2012
 Marico Innovation for India Awards 2012 In The Social Category, 2012
 Finalists in the Special Category of Vodafone Mobile for Good Awards 2014

Notes 
https://originals.storiesasia.org/-cancer-in-the-time-of-covid-19/index.html

https://www.news18.com/news/buzz/how-a-group-of-architects-is-cycling-from-bombay-to-goa-to-raise-awareness-about-child-cancer-2402599.html
https://www.news18.com/news/buzz/how-a-group-of-architects-is-cycling-from-bombay-to-goa-to-raise-awareness-about-child-cancer-2402599.html
https://www.indiaspend.com/why-4-of-5-indian-children-do-not-survive-cancer/
http://eclecticnortheast.in/2019/08/st-judes-brings-a-ray-of-hope-for-children-being-treated-for-cancer/
https://www.financialexpress.com/lifestyle/health/fighting-cancer-in-children-providing-free-treatment-to-needy-young-ones-and-providing-education/1653961/
https://www.firstpost.com/india/world-cancer-survivors-day-centre-provides-patients-under-treatment-free-accommodation-in-big-cities6742541-6742541.html
https://www.news18.com/news/india/children-suffering-from-cancer-now-have-a-ray-of-hope-thanks-to-this-non-profit-facility-2167145.html 

The Asian age
http://www.livemint.com/Money/DM2qSgozigd9JjvMQbu8oJ/UTI-AMC-ties-up-with-cancer-support-firm-to-encourage-donati.html
http://www.csrtimes.com/community-articles/st-jude-india-childcare-centres-bringing-sunshine-to-wilting-flowers/400
http://www.spiceroutemag.com/offering_holistic_care.html

ToI City Lights 23 March:
http://epaperbeta.timesofindia.com//Article.aspx?eid=31804&articlexml=CITY-LIGHTS-02032015006027
http://nrinews24x7.com/tata-medical-center-inaugurates-premashraya-residential-facility-for-underprivileged-cancer-patients-and-relatives/
http://www.kolkatafirst.in/?author=1
Times City Kolkata
Mumbai Mirror
The Telegraph
https://www.thebetterindia.com/134385/st-jude-india-child-care-centre-caring-for-kids-with-cancer-india/
http://www.dnaindia.com/analysis/column-a-ray-of-hope-for-cancer-stricken-kids-2585776

Radio ONE, Feb 2018
https://soundcloud.com/hrishikay/hrishi-k-with-usha-banerji-ceo-st-jude-india-cancer-childcare-centre

Healthcare in Mumbai